Gijali-ye Bala (also Romanized as Gījālī-ye Bālā; also known as Gījālī-ye ‘Olyā) is a village in Valanjerd Rural District, in the Central District of Borujerd County, Lorestan Province, Iran. At the 2006 census, its population was 257, in 70 families.

References 

Towns and villages in Borujerd County